The CMLL World Women's Championship (Campeonato Mundial Femenil de CMLL in Spanish) is the championship in women's professional wrestling  that is most highly promoted by the Mexican lucha libre promotion Consejo Mundial de Lucha Libre (CMLL). The championship has existed since 1992 and is one of two women's championships currently promoted by CMLL; the other is the Mexican National Women's Championship. As it is a professional wrestling championship, it is not won legitimately; it is instead won via a scripted ending to a match or awarded to a wrestler because of a storyline. All title matches take place under two out of three falls rules.

Bull Nakano became the first CMLL World Women's Champion after winning a 12-woman battle royal to receive the title on June 12, 1992. Dalys la Caribeña is the current CMLL World Women's Champion, having defeated Marcela on March 11, 2016. This is Dalys first reign with the title; she is the 18th overall champion. La Amapola holds the record for the longest reign with 1,442 days. Marcela has had the most reigns, with five. Marcela has had the shortest title reign, at 29 days. The CMLL World Women's Championship is the only Women's Championship and one of the only of two championships, the other being the IWGP Heavyweight Championship to be defended in the country of North Korea at the event Collision in Korea in a match between at the time CMLL World Women's Champion Akira Hokuto successfully defeated against Bull Nakano.

Title history

Combined reigns

Championship tournaments

1992 Championship tournament
CMLL held a 15-woman torneo cibernetico elimination match on June 5, 1992, to determine the two women who would fight for the newly created CMLL World Women's champion the following week. La Diabólica was originally scheduled to work the match, but did not appear which led to the uneven sides in the elimination match. Several of the participants had recently joined CMLL, leaving the Universal Wrestling Association to join CMLL and its recently restarted women's division. Zuleyma was the reigning UWA World Women's Championship going into the match and CMLL allowed her to keep and defend the UWA championship in the years following Zuleyma's jump to CMLL. The finals came down to Lola Gonzales, a pioneer for women's wrestling in Mexico, and Bull Nakano, a Japanese wrestler that worked regularly for CMLL. The following week, on June 12, 1993, Bull Nakano became the first CMLL World Women's Champion by virtue of her victory over Lola Gonzales.

1996 Championship tournament
On November 6, 1996, CMLL took the CMLL World Women's Championship away from then reigning champion Reina Jubuki because she had wrestled on a World Championship Wrestling (WCW) show in North America only a few days prior. At the time WCW had a working relationship with Asistencia Asesoría y Administración (AAA), CMLL's main rival in Mexico and thus appearing for WCW was enough for CMLL to sever ties with Jubuki. CMLL held a tournament to crown a new champion only 2 days after announcing the title being vacated, choosing four of their top female competitors for a quick four-woman tournament.

2005 Championship tournament

The reigning champion, La Diabólica left CMLL to join rival Asistencia Asesoría y Administración (AAA) on April 5, 2003, which forced CMLL to vacate the championship. This happened during a time of very low activity in CMLL's female division, which meant the title was inactive for over two years before CMLL held a tournament for the title starting on September 9, 2005. CMLL held a nine-woman torneo cibernetico elimination match to determine the two finalists that would face off the next week in a best two-out-of-three falls match. Dark Angel and Marcela survived the match and met on September 16, 2005, with Marcela winning the match and her first CMLL World Women's Championship.

Footnotes

References
General sources
[G1] –
Specific sources

Consejo Mundial de Lucha Libre championships
World professional wrestling championships
Women's professional wrestling championships